The Little Polar Bear (in ) is a franchise about a polar bear cub named Lars who first starred in a number of books written by Dutch author, Hans de Beer.

The first of several animated adaptations of the books is a Japanese original video animation, released on April 28, 1990, with animation production by I.G Tatsunoko (now known as Production I.G).

It later became an animated TV series for BBC TV and WDR Lars, der kleine Eisbär, in the 1990s. The show proved to be popular in Germany.

The show was later revived between 2001 and 2003. For its first film, subtitled Der Kinofilm, Warner Bros. and animation studio Rothkirch Cartoon Film bought the rights to adapt the children's books into a feature-length film, released in 2001.

Following the success of the feature, several direct-to-video features were released, one of the new characters included was a tiger cub. In 2005, another film, The Little Polar Bear 2: The Mysterious Island was released and also proved successful.

The score to The Little Polar Bear was composed by Nigel Clarke & Michael Csanyi-Wills and recorded by the Royal Philharmonic Orchestra in London and was nominated for several awards.

Original BBC TV series adaptation

In the mid-1990s there was a German-British TV adaptation for the BBC and WDR, featuring the voice talents of Susan Sheridan and Jimmy Hibbert. The animation of the series was provided by Sinan Gungor.

Voices
 Susan Sheridan - Lars, Lena, Peeps, Mummy Polar Bear,
 Jimmy Hibbert - Daddy Polar Bear, various male voices
 Vanessa Feltz - Brownie Brown Bear

Characters
 Lars - the little polar bear, main character of the show
 Frieda, Lars' mother
 Mika, Lars' father
 Lena - the Arctic hare
 Peeps - the snow goose
 Brownie Brown Bear

Episodes

Film

The Little Polar Bear is a 2001 German film based on the books of the same name. It is directed by Piet De Rycker and Thilo Rothkirch and produced by Willi Geike. The film was distributed in Germany by Warner Bros. Germany through the Warner Bros. Family Entertainment unit on 4 October 2001.

Warner Bros also produced an English dub of the film that was released in America and Britain in 2003.

Sequels 
 The Little Polar Bear: Lars and the Little Tiger (2002)
 The Little Polar Bear: The Dream of Flying (2002)
 The Little Polar Bear: Nanouk's Rescue (2003)
 The Little Polar Bear: A Visitor from the South Pole (2002)
 The Little Polar Bear: The Mysterious Island (2005)

Voice cast

Additional English Voices
 Steve Bulen
 Richard Cansino
 Melora Harte

References

External links

 
 
 
 
 
 
 
 
 
 
 Original score: Nigel Clarke & Michael Csanyi Wills

1990 anime OVAs
Production I.G
Single OVAs
1992 German television series debuts
2000s German television series
German children's animated adventure television series
German-language television shows
British television shows based on children's books
Television shows set in the Arctic
Das Erste original programming
1994 British television series debuts
1994 British television series endings
1990s British children's television series
German children's literature
Books about bears
2001 films
2001 animated films
German animated films
British animated films
German children's films
2000s German-language films
Warner Bros. films
Warner Bros. animated films
Television series by Warner Bros. Television Studios
Films set in the Arctic
Animated films based on children's books
Animated films about bears
Films about polar bears
Films set in Alaska
Films set in Canada
2000s English-language films
2000s American films
2000s British films
2000s German films